This is a complete discography listing for Split Enz, a New Zealand-originated experimental rock-pop group.  Their creative output includes several albums, singles, music videos, compilations as well as having albums pay tribute by other artists.

Albums

Studio albums

Live albums

Compilations

Box sets

Tribute albums

Singles
Where available, chart positions are given for each country of release. 
A mark of " — " indicates the single was released in that country, but did not chart. Cells in dark grey indicate that the single was not released in that country.

Video albums

See also

 Crowded House discography

References

External links
 

Discography
Split Enz
Rock music group discographies
Pop music group discographies
New wave discographies